Downtown Binghamton is a neighborhood in Binghamton, New York located on the north bank of the Susquehanna River, just east of its confluence with the Chenango River. It is the business and administrative center of the City of Binghamton, the Greater Binghamton area and Broome County.

Downtown Binghamton can be defined as encompassing the area north of the Susquehanna River, east of the Chenango River, west of Brandywine Avenue (NY-7) and south of the Norfolk Southern tracks.

Downtown is the business and administrative center of the city and region. It is home to the principal state, county and city offices, which are located within Government Plaza on Hawley Street between State and Isbell streets. Important commercial streets include Chenango, Court, Hawley, State and Washington streets.

BC Junction, Broome County Transit's point of departure for the majority of its fixed routes, is located on the corner of Henry Street and Prospect Avenue in this neighborhood.

References 

Neighborhoods in Binghamton, New York
Binghamton